Thomas Hamar Greenwood, 1st Viscount Greenwood, PC, KC (7 February 1870 – 10 September 1948), known as Sir Hamar Greenwood, Bt, between 1915 and 1929, was a Canadian-born British lawyer and politician. He served as the last Chief Secretary for Ireland between 1920 and 1922 and is associated with the activities of the Black and Tans in Ireland. Both his sons died unmarried meaning that the title of Viscount Greenwood became extinct in 2003.

Background and education
Greenwood was born in Whitby, Ontario, Canada, to John Hamar Greenwood (1829-1903), a lawyer who emigrated from Llanbister, Radnorshire, Wales, as a youth, and wife Charlotte Churchill Hubbard, who was from a United Empire Loyalist family that had an ancestor who immigrated to Canada after the American Revolutionary War. He was educated at the University of Toronto before emigrating to England as a young man.

Political career
Greenwood first stood for election as a Liberal and sat as a Member of Parliament for York from 1906 to 1910 and for Sunderland from 1910 to 1922.

He served under David Lloyd George as Under-Secretary of State for the Home Department in 1919, as Additional Under-Secretary of State for Foreign Affairs, Additional Parliamentary Secretary to the Board of Trade, as Secretary for Overseas Trade from 1919 to 1920, and as the last Chief Secretary for Ireland, with a seat in the Cabinet, from 1920 to 1922. He was made a Privy Counsellor in 1920.

As Chief Secretary, Greenwood was closely identified with the aggressive use of two specially formed paramilitary forces – the Black and Tans and the Auxiliaries – during the Irish War of Independence. After the burning of the centre of the city of Cork by British auxiliary forces in December 1920, Greenwood blamed the "Sinn Féin rebels" and the people of Cork for burning their own city. "A Lloyd George loyalist who believed in restoring British rule in Ireland by defeating the IRA, Greenwood’s denials and evasions became so frequent that he was lampooned with the phrase 'to tell a Greenwood'."

Greenwood lost his seat in the 1922 general election. At the 1924 general election, he was one of a small number of Liberals, including Winston Churchill, to stand as Constitutionalist candidates. These were Liberals who advocated closer ties between Liberals and Conservatives. Greenwood's candidature in Walthamstow East was supported by the local Conservative association, but not by the local Liberals, who had their own candidate, and he won the seat. After the election, when it appeared that there was no prospect of closer formal ties between the two parties, Greenwood took the Conservative whip. He continued to represent Walthamstow East until 1929, although he never held government office again.

Post-politics
Greenwood had been created a baronet, of Onslow Gardens in the Royal Borough of Kensington, in 1915, and in the 1929 Dissolution Honours he was raised to the peerage as Baron Greenwood, of Llanbister in the County of Radnor.

In 1937 he was further honoured when he was created Viscount Greenwood, of Holbourne in the County of London. He was president of the British Iron and Steel Federation from 1938 to 1939 and chairman of the Pilgrims Society from 1945 to 1948, and president of the Pilgrims Society in 1948.

He died on 10 September 1948 in London, England.

Family
His wife, Margery Spencer, daughter of The Rev. Walter Spencer of Fownhope
Court, Herefordshire, and wife Anne "Annie" Elizabeth Hudson, became Viscountess Greenwood. She was made a Dame Commander of the Most Excellent Order of the British Empire (DBE) in 1922. She was the sister of Muriel Forbes-Sempill, second wife of Wilfrid Ashley, 1st Baron Mount Temple, known as Molly Mountemple.

They had two sons and two daughters. Their elder son, David Henry Hamar Greenwood, succeeded his father as second Viscount. He died unmarried and was succeeded as third Viscount by his younger brother, Michael George Hamar Greenwood, who died unmarried as well, in 2003 rendering the title extinct.

Their elder daughter, Angela Margo Hamar Greenwood, married Edward Dudley Delevingne and is the paternal grandmother of model sisters Poppy and Cara Delevingne. Their younger daughter, Deborah Hamar Greenwood, married Patrick David de László, son of painter Philip de László.

Arms

References

External links
 
British Diplomacy and Canadian Responsibilities.
Hamar Greenwood at Whitby Public Library and Archives Digital Collection

1870 births
1948 deaths
University of Toronto alumni
People of the Irish War of Independence
Liberal Party (UK) MPs for English constituencies
Conservative Party (UK) MPs for English constituencies
Canadian emigrants to England
Canadian people of Welsh descent
Greenwood family
Members of the Privy Council of Ireland
Members of the Privy Council of the United Kingdom
Members of Gray's Inn
UK MPs 1906–1910
UK MPs 1910–1918
UK MPs 1918–1922
UK MPs 1924–1929
UK MPs who were granted peerages
People from Whitby, Ontario
Chief Secretaries for Ireland
English people of Welsh descent
National Liberal Party (UK, 1922) politicians
Barons created by George V
Viscounts created by George VI